Bolesław Gościewicz (14 April 1890 – 26 August 1973) was a Polish sports shooter. He competed in two events at the 1924 Summer Olympics.

References

External links
 

1890 births
1973 deaths
Polish male sport shooters
Olympic shooters of Poland
Shooters at the 1924 Summer Olympics
People from Kaunas District Municipality
People from the Russian Empire of Polish descent